Mercuralia is a Roman celebration known also as the "Festival of Mercury". Mercury (Greek counterpart: Hermes) was the god of merchants and commerce. On May 15 merchants would sprinkle their heads, their ships and merchandise, and their businesses with water taken from the well at Porta Capena.

Ancient Roman festivals
May observances
Religious festivals in Italy
Festivals of Hermes